Grace Levy is a British actress, model and beauty pageant titleholder who was crowned as Miss Universe Great Britain 2014 and represented the country at Miss Universe 2014 pageant.

Pageantry

Miss Bristol 2010
Levy came second runner up in Miss Bristol in 2010.

Miss Bristol 2011
Levy came second place in Miss Bristol 2011.

Miss Universe Great Britain 2011 
Levy entered the competition after being awarded direct entry into the final, which was held at the NEC in Birmingham. Grace finished unplaced, Chloe Beth Morgan took the crown and went on to represent Great Britain at the Miss Universe 2011 finals in Brazil.

Miss England 2012
Levy was crowned as Miss Hampshire in 2012. This led to her competing in Miss England that year where she placed Top 15 as a 'Judges choice'. Within the Miss England competition this year, Levy was a finalist for the Great Lengths Hair round, and also a top 20 talent finalist.

Miss England 2013
Levy was crowned as Miss Greater London 2013 and competed at Miss England 2013. She was awarded Miss Eco at the event and placed Top 5 in the Talent round where she performed live on stage. She finished Top 15.

Miss Universe Great Britain 2014
Levy was crowned as Miss Great Britain Universe 2014 representing England on 21 June 2014 in Cardiff, Wales. The pageant was followed by 31 contestants from England, Wales and Scotland to compete for the title.

Miss Universe 2014
Levy competed at Miss Universe 2014 in Miami but was unplaced, despite having a large following and many top 10 predictions. A 'judges sheet' from unknown sources circulated after the competition stating that Levy placed 17th, just falling outside the Top 15 acknowledgement. However, this sheet has since ceased to be findable on the internet and has no credible source.

Television
Grace was featured on series three Paddy McGuinness popular dating show Take Me Out and went on a date with a fire-dancing hippie who worked for Greenpeace. However, the couple did not last past the airing of the series due to personal differences.

Career 
Since returning from Miami where she competed at Miss Universe, Levy opened a beauty pageant training School in London called  The London School of Pageantry. The school is based in Chelsea and Piccadily and is open all year round. The school aims to increase entrants chances in national and international beauty pageants by offering world-class training to any woman interested in entering a pageant from any system. To date the school has had impressive results with a number of placements.

References

External links

Missuniversegb.co.uk

Living people
Miss Universe 2014 contestants
Actresses from Bristol
Year of birth missing (living people)
Models from London
English female models
English beauty pageant winners
21st-century English women
Models from Bristol